Elisa Milena Smit Márquez (born 5 October 1996) is a Spanish film and television actress. She was nominated at the 35th Goya Awards for best new actress for her work in Cross the Line.

Biography
Milena Smit was born on 5 October 1996 in Elche, Spain. She was raised in Torrevieja, Torre de la Horadada, and Murcia. She first started working in show business as a model when she was 15 years old. She moved to Madrid in search of career opportunities. Her father is Dutch and mother is Spanish.

She trained as an actress at the Cristina Rota acting school and was taught by Bernard Hiller, an acting coach of such actors as Leonardo DiCaprio and Cameron Diaz. Before becoming an actress, she was a waitress, shop assistant, babysitter, and information assistant on the subway.

Career
Smit's first film appearances were in various short films such as Diagonales, Innermost, Chimichanga, and Adentro. In 2020, she appeared in her first feature film, Cross the Line, directed by David Victori with Mario Casas. For her work on the film, she was nominated at the Goya Awards for best new actress. The film's casting team discovered the actress via a social network: "After much searching, we found Milena on Instagram. We fell in love with everything she had in common with the character."

After her participation in Cross the Line, she was signed by Pedro Almodóvar for his film Parallel Mothers with Penélope Cruz and Aitana Sánchez-Gijón. In the film, Smit and Cruz play women who become pregnant by accident and befriend each other in the maternity ward. Both characters give birth to girls on the same day. On her performance in the film, director Almodóvar said: "she has an emotional intelligence and a sincerity that are not learned in any school"; he also said her role in the 2020 film Cross the Line was "overwhelming". Smit received a Goya Award nomination for Best Supporting Actress for the role.

Smit is one of the leads in the upcoming Netflix original series The Girl in the Mirror, directed by Sergio G. Sánchez. In July 2021, filming began on the horror film Tin&Tina, in which she appears with Jaime Lorente. Smit also appeared in Luc Knowles's debut feature Dragonflies alongside Olivia Baglivi, performing the role of Cata.

Filmography

Film

Television

References

External links

21st-century Spanish actresses
1996 births
Spanish film actresses
Spanish television actresses
Living people
People from Elche
Spanish people of Dutch descent